Semecarpus pseudoemarginatus is a species of plant in the family Anacardiaceae. It is endemic to Sri Lanka. The specific epithet is also spelt pseudo-emarginata.

References

Endemic flora of Sri Lanka
pseudoemarginatus
Critically endangered plants
Taxonomy articles created by Polbot